Wiem Gommies (born 31 December 1945) is an Indonesian boxer. He competed in the men's middleweight event at the 1972 Summer Olympics. At the 1972 Summer Olympics, he lost to Vyacheslav Lemeshev of the Soviet Union.

References

External links
 

1945 births
Living people
Indonesian male boxers
Olympic boxers of Indonesia
Boxers at the 1972 Summer Olympics
People from Ambon, Maluku
Sportspeople from Maluku (province)
Asian Games medalists in boxing
Boxers at the 1970 Asian Games
Boxers at the 1978 Asian Games
Asian Games gold medalists for Indonesia
Medalists at the 1970 Asian Games
Medalists at the 1978 Asian Games
Southeast Asian Games medalists in boxing
Middleweight boxers
Competitors at the 1977 Southeast Asian Games
Indonesian sports coaches
Boxing trainers
20th-century Indonesian people